Iron Spade is the codename given to Israel's latest attempt to use technology in an effort to prevent offensive tunnels being built from Gaza into Israel. It is reported to be based in part on the Iron Dome project. The primary developer of the project is Elbit Systems, with Rafael, developers of Iron Dome also involved in the project.

References

Rafael Advanced Defense Systems
Defense companies of Israel